The Fiat Siena is a subcompact car produced by the Italian manufacturer Fiat from 1996 to 2022. It is the four-door sedan version of the Fiat Palio, a supermini car especially designed for developing countries. It was introduced for the first time in South America, and was produced in various countries worldwide. Later, in 2002, a similar car based on the same platform was developed for the European market, the Fiat Albea. It replaced the Siena in these European markets, such as Poland and Turkey, where the original model was previously sold.

In 2012, Fiat released the second generation of the Siena, called the Fiat Grand Siena.

The Siena was one of the most popular saloons in Brazil, selling in over 800,000 units throughout 14 years of presence. In Italy the car was not marketed, after the flop of the predecessor Fiat Duna.



First generation (178; 1996-2016)

1996–2000 (Phase I)
Launched in Brazil in 1996 as the four-door sedan of the Fiat Palio, whose code name was Type 178, the Siena was made due to the important sales benchmarks of hatchback models in developing countries. The range was made from Fiasa and Fire 1.0 L to 1.6 L gasoline engines.

2001–2006 (Phase II)

In 2001, the model received its first facelift. It was designed by the Italian design guru Giorgetto Giugiaro. The facelift included new front and rear fascias and a brand-new interior. It also came with new engines: the 16-valve Fire engines 1.0 L 70 HP and the 1.2 L 82 HP. In Turkey and China, the redesign Siena was introduced with a "Speedgear" Continuously variable transmission. With this new design, the small car was finally able to fight for its place in the market, becoming a success in sales. Fiat had considered changing the name to Palio Sedan, due to the lack of interest on the previous Siena, and the solid sales of its biggest competitor, the Chevrolet Prisma. This idea was later discarded. Up to this point, the Fiat Siena was the only model belonging to the Palio family that had not been well accepted by the community. Therefore, Fiat gave special attention to the design of this model, in particular, having its rear entirely redesigned.

2004–2012 (Phase III)

A second facelift was presented in 2004. The designer was again Giorgetto Giugiaro. It has a new front, rear, and interior design. The 2004 Siena was the first Brazilian compact 4-door sedan with four airbags (two at front and two side airbags), auto-dimming rear-view mirror, rain sensor and park assistance. These accessories, however, are very expensive for the Brazilian and most other South American markets, so they are generally not found in end-use vehicles. The Siena EL was sold with 1.0 and 1.4 engines, both 8-valve units.

In Europe, the new model features the 2004 front and interior design and a 2001 rear design. The Albea, European version of the Siena, also gained the 1.3 Multijet diesel engine, a second generation common rail turbocharged engine, developing .

2007–2016 (Phase IV)

In 2007, Fiat unveiled the facelifted Siena. This fourth version of the model has a unique front design, which for the first time is different from the current Palio.

The new Siena follows the new Fiat 'family face', with double front lights and some chrome details in the grille, and around the fog lights. The rear lights are sharp and integrated with the trunk and appeared to be inspired by models of Alfa Romeo, like the 156 and 159.

The new Siena is in production at Betim (Brazil) and Córdoba (Argentina), with 1.0 8v, 1.4 8v, 1.4 8v TetraFuel, and 1.8 8v engines, flexible for the Brazilian market (capable of using gasoline and ethanol). The TetraFuel is the first multifuel car that can run as a flexi-fuel on pure gasoline, or E25, or E100; or runs as a bi-fuel with natural gas (CNG). As of 2011, the sportive version – Siena Sporting 1.6R 16v, equipped with Fiat's Dualogic automatic gearbox – were also in production, although Fiat announced that this variant won't be offered anymore from 2012. All the New Siena EL 1.0, EL 1.4 and many ELX versions circulating at Brazil were, actually, manufactured at Argentina, as Betim's factory is still producing only the more expensive versions.

Production
It was produced in Brazil (Betim Plant) and Argentina (Ferreyra). In the past it was also produced in Turkey (Bursa), Poland (Tychy) (1997–2001), India (Pune) (1999–2004), South Africa (Rosslyn), China (Nanjing), Iran (Saveh), Morocco (Casablanca) and Vietnam.

It has also been built under license in Nampo, North Korea from 2002 to 2006, as the Pyeonghwa Hwiparam. In 2013, Venezuelan production of a Siena launched with "Dodge Forza" badges. The Dodge Forza received a 1.4-liter, CNG-powered FIRE four-cylinder engine and a five-speed manual transmission.

The production of the first generation of Siena officially ends in October 2016.

Sales
The following columns show the sales figures of the Fiat Siena in Brazil and Argentina.

China

Siena
In November 2001, the Fiat Palio debuted on the Chinese market, with either the  1.2-liter or the  1.5-liter, followed by the Siena (effectively the large-wheelbase version, the Albea) in November 2002, and the Palio Weekend in June 2003. The Siena and Weekend were not available with the smaller engine.

Perla

The Nanjing Fiat Perla, launched at the 2006 Auto Guangzhou Motor Show, is based on the Fiat Albea platform. The car's rear got a more profound facelift for the Chinese market. For example, the rear is longer and lower than the Siena. It has a new 1.7-liter gasoline engine, air conditioning, dual front airbags, anti-lock brakes, power steering, power windows, central locking, and many other features.

Since Fiat withdrew from Nanjing in 2007 and SAIC took over, discontinuing the Fiat models, the Perla only had a very brief existence.

Zotye
In 2008, Zotye Auto purchased the tooling for the Palio and the Siena, and in 2011, launched its own restyled version of the car, the Zotye Z200, which is produced in both hatchback and sedan form. Production ran from 2011 to 2014.

Safety rating
The Albea scored 8.5 points in the frontal test, equivalent to 3 stars. The tested vehicle was equipped with standard driver airbag and regular seatbelts.

The Fiat Perla, a Chinese version of the Fiat Albea, was tested in China by the China-NCAP in three different tests: a 100% front crash test with a wall (like the US NTHSA test), a 40% offset test (like the Euro NCAP), and a side crash test (like in the Euro NCAP). The Perla scored 8.06 points in the 100% frontal crash test, equivalent to 3 stars, 12.02 points in the 40% offset crash test, equivalent to 4 stars, and 10.96 points in the side crash test, equivalent to 3 stars. The average result was 31 points and 3 stars. The tested vehicle was equipped with standard driver and passenger airbags and regular seatbelts.

Second generation (326; 2012-2022)

The second generation of the Fiat Siena (Type 326) was unveiled in South America in 2012, under the Fiat Grand Siena name and from 2015 to 2018 under the Dodge Vision name in Mexico, as the production of the previous generation continues along the new version.

The platform of the new generation is derived from the new Palio, but with a longer wheelbase. The exterior design is different from the new Palio and was inspired by the Fiat Bravo, while the rear design was inspired by Fiat Linea. The interior is the same used in the Palio, with specific details.

The Grand Siena is larger than its predecessor, but smaller than the Fiat Linea compact car. The new model weights less and has more legroom compared to its predecessor. The front suspension is composed by the same MacPherson system of the new Palio, but the rear suspension uses a new type of torsion beam.

Production of the Grand Siena started in 2012, at first at the Betim plant in Brazil. The Grand Siena is marketed in South America and Mexico (as the Dodge Vision). In 2018 production of the engine 1.4 Fire Evo flex and 1.6 E.torQ flex end, the only engine available is the 1.0 Fire Evo flex.

The 2017 model received small changes, such as a redesigned grille, new interior colors and the relocation of the USB connector to the center console in the versions with manual transmission.

Optional for the 1.4 is the prep for the installation of CNG.

The Grand Siena production ends at the end of December 2021 because of Proconve L7 emissions standards.

Sales

See also
 Fiat Palio
 Fiat Strada

References

External links

 Official Fiat Siena website

Siena
Sedans
Compact cars
Taxi vehicles
Police vehicles
Front-wheel-drive vehicles
2000s cars
2010s cars
Cars introduced in 1996
Cars of China
Flexible-fuel vehicles
Cars of India
Cars of Brazil
Cars of Argentina